Finnøya or Finnøy may refer to:

Places

Norway
Finnøy, an island municipality in Rogaland county
Finnøy (island), an island in Finnøy municipality, Rogaland county
Finnøya, Agder, an island in Risør municipality, Agder county
Finnøya, Bø, an island in Bø municipality, Nordland county
Finnøya, Finnmark, an island in Hammerfest municipality, Troms og Finnmark county
Finnøya, Møre og Romsdal, an island in Sandøy municipality, Møre og Romsdal county
Finnøya, Nordland, an island in Hamarøy municipality, Nordland county
Finnøya, Vågan, an island in Vågan municipality, Nordland county

Other
Finnøy Tunnel, an undersea road tunnel in Rogaland county, Norway